Alan Norris may refer to:
 Alan Norris (darts player) (born 1972), English darts player
 Alan Eugene Norris (born 1935), U.S. federal judge
 Alan J. Norris, 2000 winner of the Scottish Chess Championship